Thelypteridaceae is a family of about 900 species of ferns in the order Polypodiales. In the Pteridophyte Phylogeny Group classification of 2016 (PPG I), it is placed in the suborder Aspleniineae. Alternatively, the family may be submerged in a very broadly defined family Aspleniaceae as the subfamily Thelypteridoideae.

The ferns are terrestrial, with the exception of a few which are lithophytes (grow on rocks).  The bulk of the species are tropical, although there are a number of temperate species.

These ferns typically have creeping rhizomes. The fronds are simply pinnate to pinnate-pinnatifid. There is either no frond dimorphism or only mild dimorphism, either open venation or very simple anastomosing. The sori are mostly reniform in shape and have indusia, except for the Phegopteris group.

Classification 
During the early and mid 1900's all thelypterioid ferns were included in the genus Dryopteris because of the sorus shape.  However, there are a great many differences between the groups, and these plants are now segregated in their own family. Genetic evidence shows that the family is clearly monophyletic.

Phylogenetic relationships
The following cladogram for the suborder Aspleniineae (as eupolypods II), based on Lehtonen (2011), and Rothfels & al. (2012), shows a likely phylogenetic relationship between the Thelypteridaceae and the other families of the clade.

Genera
The family can be divided into two major clades, which the Pteridophyte Phylogeny Group classification of 2016 (PPG I) recognizes as two subfamilies, Phegopteridoideae and Thelypteroideae. Their division into genera has been described as "highly controversial and fluctuating". The family includes several complexes of species that are difficult to distinguish, and seem to represent a remarkable evolutionary radiation. Some researchers include the entire family Thelypteridaceae in the genus Thelypteris; others divide the family into as many as 30 genera. An intermediate position is to place the bulk in Thelypteris (which can then be divided into subgenera and sections corresponding to the genera of other authors) but to separate out Phegopteris and Macrothelypteris. Another choice is to divide the family into a half a dozen or so genera.

         }}
       }}
     }}
   }}
}}
}}

The Pteridophyte Phylogeny Group classification of 2016 (PPG I) accepts 30 genera:
Subfamily Phegopteridoideae Salino, A.R.Sm. & T.E.Almeid
Macrothelypteris (H.Ito) Ching
Phegopteris (C.Presl) Fée
Pseudophegopteris Ching
Subfamily Thelypteridoideae C.F.Reed
Steiropteris (C.Chr.) Pic.Serm.
Tribe Thelypterideae Ching 1963
Thelypteris Schmidel
Tribe Amauropelteae Wei, Liu & Liu
Amauropelta Kunze
Coryphopteris Holttum
Metathelypteris (H.Ito) Ching
Tribe Oreopterideae Wei, Liu & Liu
Oreopteris Holub
Tribe Leptogrammeae Todaro 1866
Cyclogramma Tagawa
Leptogramma Smith
Stegnogramma Blume
Tribe Meniscieae Fée 1850-1852 ex Pfeiffer 1873
Subtribe Goniopteridinae Ching 1963
Goniopteris C.Presl
Subtribe Menisciinae Payer 1850
Ampelopteris Kunze
Cyclosorus Link
Meniscium Schreb.
Mesophlebion Holttum
Subtribe Pseudocyclosorinae Ching 1963
Abacopteris Fée
Amblovenatum J.P.Roux
Chingia Holttum
Christella H.Lév.
Glaphyropteridopsis Ching
Grypothrix (Holttum 1971) Fawcett & Smith
Menisciopsis (Holttum 1982) Fawcett & Smith
Menisorus Alston
Mesopteris Ching
Pakau Fawcett & Smith
Parathelypteris (H.Ito) Ching
Pelazoneuron (Holttum 1974) Smith & Fawcett
Plesioneuron (Holttum) Holttum
Pneumatopteris Nakai
Pronephrium C.Presl [Nannothelypteris Holttum]
Pseudocyclosorus Ching
Reholttumia Fawcett & Smith
Sphaerostephanos J.Sm.
Strophocaulon Fawcett & Smith
Trigonospora Holttum
Some species of Pronephrium were split off into other genera in 2021 as a result of a phylogenetic study of the family Thelypteridaceae:
Abacopteris Fée
Grypothrix (Holttum) S.E.Fawc. & A.R.Sm.
Menisciopsis (Holttum) S.E.Fawc. & A.R.Sm

The extinct genus Holttumopteris from the Cenomanian aged Burmese amber has been suggested to have affinities with the family, but several important diagnostic characters are not preserved.

References

 
Fern families